Gideon L. Mapes (1832May 15, 1895) was a 19th-century New York Sandy Hook Pilot. He was one of the oldest Sandy Hook pilots with his pilots' license dating back to 1852. He lost his life after boarding a White Star Line freight steamship coming into the New York Harbor. He was the pilot and part owner of the pilot boats Eben D. Jordan and Widgeon.

Early life

Gideon Mapes was born in 1832. His father was Gideon Mapes and his mother's maiden name was Smith. The Mapes's family's had early ties with Long Island. Thomas Mapes was one of the first thirteen settlers of Southold, Long Island in 1640. Gideon Mapes married Agnes Parrott on January 2, 1852. They had one child. His wife died three years before him on December 26, 1892, and was buried at the Northport Rural Cemetery in Northport, New York.

Career

Mapes was one of the oldest Sandy Hook pilots with his pilots' license dating back to 1852. He was the pilot and part owner of the pilot boats Eben D. Jordan, No. 9, and Widgeon, No. 10.

The 1850 Federal Census shows Mapes, age 22, living in New York City as pilot in the "water transportation" business; with Mary Mapes, age 21; and daughter Charlotte Mapes, age 2. The Brooklyn, New York, City Directory for 1857, show Mapes as a pilot, living at 21 Ridge, New York City before moving to Brooklyn.

On January 21, 1857, the Anthony B. Neilson was out cruising with pilots Gideon Mapes, John Clarke, Peter Bayley, Thomas Aitken, George W. Christopher, Ralph Noble, and William Anderson. After boarding a schooner at Owl's Head, both vessels were carried ashore by the ice. They were rescued by the steamtug Hercules. The Neilson lost part of her keel and broke her rudder.

The American Civil War, Draft Registrations Records for 1863, listed Mapes as 34 years old, a pilot, living in Brooklyn and married. During the Civil War he served on the gunboat Fulton and received funds for capturing enemy boats.

From 1871-1878, Mapes was a part owner of the pilot boat Widgeon, No. 10. In November 1879, Gideon Mapes, Ralph Nobles, and other pilots from the Widgeon, bought the steam tugboat Hercules in an attempt to introduced a new steam pilot-boat into the service. They converted the Hercules into a pilot-boat. They placed the number "10" on her smokestack. They condemned the Widgeon as unseaworthy.

In 1889, Mapes was in charge of the pilot boat Jesse Carll, No. 10, when it was off Fire Island and got stuck on a sandbar at Zach's Inlet during a thunderstorm. Mapes and the ten men on board were taken ashore in life-saving boats. The Jesse Carll was later raised and repaired.

Death

On May 19, 1895, Gideon Mapes, at age 63, died of heart failure soon after boarding the White Star Line freighter S.S. Cufic, after passing Sandy Hook and moving into the main ship channel of the New York Harbor. He died St. Vicents' Hospital in New York City. He lived in Brooklyn and was a widower with no surviving children.

He was buried at the Northport Rural Cemetery in Northport, New York. His sister, Caroline E. Dowwing, from Brooklyn, was the petitioner of his estate in Kings County, Brooklyn, New York. Mapes had one other brother and sister.

See also

List of Northeastern U. S. Pilot Boats

References

 

Maritime pilotage
Sea captains
People from Brooklyn
1895 deaths
1825 births